Barking at the Stars is a 1998 Yugoslav film directed by Zdravko Šotra.

Although it was filmed during a decade of war and hardship in the former Yugoslavia, the film was overall praised for its wholesomeness, as it does not contain any swearing, nudity, or talk of politics.

Plot 
The story is told as a flashback. It was the year 1963 in the small fictional town of Moravski Karlovci. The action centres around the students in IV-2, the graduating class of the local high school. A boy whose nickname is Philosopher is developing feelings for his classmate, Danica. He's a lot smarter than other students, sometimes even smarter than his professors. There's also his best friend, who is trying to practice boxing for his big match in the capital, passionately trained by the P.E. teacher. In this story, everyone finds his/her soulmate, even the professors. Philosopher wants to win over Danica's heart, but he has a rival--his own older brother who appears to be cooler because he has a motorbike and earns money on his own. Danica tries hard to resist all the flirting and everything Philosopher says to her in an attempt to win her heart, but eventually, she can't fight back anymore. The class goes on an excursion to Montenegro with their homeroom teacher and along the way, Philosopher and Danica share their first kiss. Fast forward to the present, they're now married and have a son who is going to his prom, using his dad's old pick up lines to win a girl over. The movie ends with the legendary quote from Philosopher when he first confessed his feelings to Danica ("Kako Tanjug javlja, ja te volim"), and with Philosopher and Danica going out on their balcony and barking at the stars.

Cast
 Dragan Mićanović - Mihajlo Knežević - Filozof
 Nataša Tapušković - Danica Janković
 Nikola Simić - Direktor
 Bata Živojinović - Božović
 Dragan Jovanović - Gradimir Stević
 Vesna Trivalić - Dana Jelinic
 Bogdan Diklić - Đuro Dragićević
 Aleksandar Berček - Slobodan Lazarević
 Nikola Đuričko - Milić Gavranić - Tupa
 Isidora Minić - Milena Koheza
 Nebojša Ilić - Bogoljub Maric
 Branimir Brstina - Nenad Lazicic / Nesa Kutuzov

Production 
The film was shot in Sremski Karlovci, with notable scenes featuring the Karlovci Gymnasium and "Four Lions" fountain, as well as in Belgrade and Montenegro.  

Actor Nikola Đuričko nearly died during one filming of a scene where his character Milić Gavranić-Tupa is racing against the train. Wanting to make his racing scene as believable as possible, he ignored the crew's signal to get off the train tracks, and allowed the train to get closer to him before starting to run. He subsequently tripped and fell on the tracks, but was helped up by a nearby crew member, thereby avoiding serious injury or death.

References

External links
 

1998 films
Yugoslav drama films
Serbian drama films
Films set in 1963
Films set in Yugoslavia
Films set in Serbia
Films with screenplays by Milovan Vitezović
Films shot in Serbia
1990s Serbian-language films
Films directed by Zdravko Šotra